Susan Phillips may refer to:

Susan Phillips (politician) (born 1949), Missouri politician
Susan A. Phillips (born 1969), American anthropologist and criminologist
Susan Elizabeth Phillips (born 1948), American romance author
Susan M. Phillips (born 1944), American economist
Susan Phillips (architect) (born 1958), Australian architect
Susan K. Phillips (1831–1897), English poet
Susanna "Susan" Phillips, (1755–1800) English correspondent born Susanna Burney
Susan Phillips, Mayor of Bournemouth